Isidoro Álvarez (1935 – 14 September 2014) was a Spanish businessman and CEO of El Corte Inglés, where he worked for 60 years, 25 of which as chairman.

Álvarez died on 14 September 2014 from respiratory problems.

References

1935 births
2014 deaths
20th-century Spanish businesspeople